Ctenoplusia adiaphora is a moth of the family Noctuidae, first described by Claude Dufay in 1974. It is found in Taiwan.

References

External links
 Image and info

Moths described in 1974
Plusiinae
Moths of Taiwan